Elmore Stoutt High School (ESHS) is a grade 7-12 secondary school in Road Town, Tortola, British Virgin Islands.

History
It was previously BVI High School (BVIHS). In September 2012  Wade Tobin became acting principal, but Vanessa Garraway became the acting principal when the former went to the hospital.

In 2017 Hurricane Irma affected BVI and damaged the school building, so students had to move to the former Clarence Thomas Ltd building in Pasea Estate. The students were divided into two shifts as the temporary building is not big enough to accommodate the students at the same time. Students in the morning shift are to go to after school programmes to keep themselves occupied.
The rebuilt school reopened its doors January 4th, 2023.

Campus
The Lillian Adorothy Turnbull Building is in the shape of an L. It received its current name in 2019.

See also
 Education in the British Virgin Islands

References

External links
Articles about the school - Government of the British Virgin Islands
"Resiliency on display at Elmore Stoutt High School" - Department of Disaster Management, British Virgin Islands
First Year Strategies Elmore Stoutt High School By Teacher Librarian – Dorothy Rabsatt

Buildings and structures in Road Town
Secondary schools in British Overseas Territories
Schools in the British Virgin Islands